Sthelota is a genus of Central American sheet weavers that was first described by Eugène Louis Simon in 1894.  it contains only two species, both found in Guatemala and Panama: S. albonotata and S. sana.

See also
 List of Linyphiidae species (Q–Z)

References

Araneomorphae genera
Linyphiidae
Spiders of Central America